Within the United States Department of Defense, the Joint Capability Areas (JCA) are a standardized set of United States military definitions that cover the complete range of military activities. The system was initially established in May 2005 by the United States Department of Defense Joint Staff with input from each of the services, designed to begin "a new framework that paves the way for side-by-side comparisons of service contributions to joint warfighting and a tool that will assist decision-makers in deciding whether to move resources between service budgets."

The establishment of the JCA was primarily a result of an Operational Availability study from 2005 and from the Joint Defense Capabilities Study of 2003 (also referred to as the Aldridge Study after its primary author, Edward Aldridge). The Aldridge study called for the establishment of a new joint lexicon that would allow leaders to clearly discuss mission areas and how to most responsibly manage resources.

Further information on JCAs can be found at the Joint Experimentation, Transformation and Concepts Division (JETCD)  of the Joint Staff J-7, Operational Plans and Joint Force Development Directorate.

Current Joint Capability Areas 

 Force Integration
 Battlespace Awareness (aka INTEL)
 Force Application (FA)
 Logistics (LOG)
 Command and Control (C2)
 Communications & Computers
 Protection (FP)
 Corporate Management and Support (CMS)

Initial Joint Capability Areas 

 Joint battlespace awareness
 Joint command and control
 Joint network operations
 Joint interagency coordination
 Joint public affairs operations
 Joint information operations
 Joint protection
 Joint logistics
 Joint force generation
 Joint force management
 Joint homeland defense
 Joint strategic deterrence
 Joint shaping and security cooperation
 Joint stability operations
 Joint civil support
 Joint non-traditional operations
 Joint access and access denial operations
 Joint land control operations
 Joint maritime/littoral control operations
 Joint air control operations
 Joint space control operations

References

External links
The JCA Framework (.xls)
Detailed JCA Definitions(.doc)

United States Department of Defense